Sally Moore may refer to:

 Sally Moore (tennis) (born 1940), American tennis player
 Sally Falk Moore (1924–2021), American anthropologist